Darius Scott, also known as DIXSON, is an American singer, songwriter, producer, and multi-instrumentalist, best known for a Season 9 live playoffs appearance on The Voice (with Team Pharrell), and his co-written and co-produced Academy Award-nominated original song "Be Alive" from the 2021 film King Richard. Scott has co-written for Chance the Rapper and Beyoncé, among others, and is a graduate of the College of Wooster.

2015: The Voice

Discography
Studio projects
 Young (2018)
 DARLING (2021)
 004DAISY (2022)

Songwriting and production credits

Credits are courtesy of Discogs, Tidal, Apple Music, and AllMusic.

Guest appearances

Filmography

Television

Music videos 
 "Big Brave Man" (2020)
 "Kream" (2021)
 "Yours" (2021)
 "Darling" (2021)
 "Cherry Sorbet" (2022)
 "Barely" (2023)

Awards and nominations

References 

21st-century American singers
21st-century American male singers
African-American songwriters
American male singer-songwriters
American rhythm and blues singer-songwriters
College of Wooster alumni
Living people
Roc Nation artists
1993 births
The Voice (franchise) contestants